Paul Goldstein may refer to:
Paul Goldstein (law professor) (born 1943), law professor at Stanford Law School
Paul Goldstein (tennis) (born 1976), American tennis player